Brunia antica is a moth of the family Erebidae described by Francis Walker in 1854. It is found from the Indian subregion, Sri Lanka to China, the Ryukyu Islands, the Chagos Archipelago, the Nicobar Islands and Sundaland.

Description
This species has a wingspan of 26 mm. Forewings with vein 9 anastomosing (fusing) with vein 8 to form an areole. There is strong sexual dimorphism in the imago, with the males having a more or less uniform straw colour, whereas females have the forewing darker, greyer, with a narrow straw-coloured costal strip. Cilia yellow and hindwings are uniformly yellow. It differs from Brunia complana in wanting the broad yellow marginal band of forewing on underside.

Ecology
The biology is unknown, but the larvae probably feed on lichen and/or algae. It is mostly found in lowland areas, most frequently in coastal vegetation, including mangroves.

References

External links

Lithosiina
Moths of Japan
Moths described in 1854